Salvadori's eremomela (Eremomela salvadorii) is a species of bird formerly placed in the Old World warbler assemblage, but now placed in the family Cisticolidae.

It is found in Zaire, Gabon, Angola and Zambia. Its name commemorates Italian zoologist and ornithologist Tommaso Salvadori. It is sometimes considered conspecific with the yellow-bellied eremomela.

Its natural habitats are subtropical or tropical dry forests and dry savanna.

References

Salvadori's eremomela
Birds of Central Africa
Salvadori's eremomela